was a Japanese non-fiction author.

Life and career 
Kamisaka was born as Yoshiko Niwa in Tokyo on June 10, 1930. Her first work, Shokuba-no gunzo (People at a Place of Work), based on her experiences as a worker for Toyota, was published in 1959 and won a prize for works by new authors.

Her best-known work is ""Keishu Nazare-en" about a facility for Japanese widows of South Koreans.

Other works dealt with Sugamo Prison, the Battle of Iwo Jima and vivisection experiments conducted by the Japanese on prisoners of war.

Death
Kamisaka died of cancer, aged 78, on April 14, 2009 in her native Tokyo.

Awards
In 1993, Kamisaka received the Kikuchi Kan Prize.

References

1931 births
2009 deaths
Deaths from cancer in Japan
20th-century Japanese historians
Writers from Tokyo
Japanese women historians
20th-century women writers